Ángel Sánchez (born March 3, 1957) is a former football (soccer) referee from Argentina, best known for supervising two matches (South Africa–Slovenia and Portugal–South Korea) during the 2002 FIFA World Cup held in South Korea and Japan. The latter game became noted as Sánchez was hit in the stomach by Portuguese attacker João Pinto after Sánchez gave Pinto a red card for a tackle against Park Ji-Sung.

Sánchez's official first division debut was in 1982; he retired in 2006.

References

 Profile

1957 births
Living people
Argentine football referees
2002 FIFA World Cup referees
Copa América referees
Place of birth missing (living people)